The Atlantic 10 Conference Men's Soccer Coach of the Year is an annual award given to the best head coach in the Atlantic 10 Conference during the NCAA Division I men's soccer season. The award has been given since 1987.

Wade Jean and Sam Koch have each won the award four times.

Winners

Coach of the Year (1987–present)

References

NCAA Division I men's soccer conference coaches of the year
Coach of the Year
Awards established in 1987